The Men's K-4 500m event at the 2010 South American Games was held over March 29 at 11:20.

Medalists

Results

References
Final

500m K-4 Men